Late Starter is a 1985 BBC TV series that ran for 8 episodes. Peter Barkworth played a cuckolded retired university professor who finds himself having to start again in a run down bedsit in North London.

Cast
 Peter Barkworth – Edward Brett
 Akosua Busia –  Nicki
 Rowena Cooper – Mary Brett
 Julia Foster – Liz Weldon
 Carol Leader – Penny Johnson
 Simon Cowell-Parker – Simon Brett

References

External links

BBC Television shows
1980s British drama television series
English-language television shows